Siavi (also Romanized as Sīāvī) is a village in Hend Khaleh Rural District, Tulem District, Sowme'eh Sara County, Gilan Province, Iran. This is a small region of one of the earliest ethnic Pashtuns in Iran, thought to have originated from Southern Afghanistan hundreds of years ago but have been able to keep their linguistic and cultural identity intact. Also, there is a village in KPK province of Pakistan, in Nizampur region of Nowhshera District by the same name, where many of the members of Siavi clan from Iran have permanently settled dating back to multiple generations.

Siavi clan probably is the oldest native Pashto speaking clan of Iran: Although the history of their arrival to Iran is not very clear, they most likely migrated from southern regions of what is now Afghanistan. According to the 2006 census, their population in the Siavi Village of Iran was only 138 members.

Currently mainly in Khyberpukhtoonwa province in Pakistan, many of the clan members have settled in the Nizampur area of Nowshera District. Their population estimated to be around 1000 strong. As was the case with their settled era over many centuries in Iran, over many centuries of settlement in mainly Khattak dominated areas, they have maintained their separate identity although many a time, culturally and linguistically, they do identify with the Khattak Tribe of Pushtoons, likely due to intermarriage and sociocultural similarities.

References 

Populated places in Sowme'eh Sara County